The Cult is the sixth studio album from English rock band, The Cult. It was released in October 1994 on Beggars Banquet Records and it is also the band's last album on Sire Records in the US. It is also commonly referred to as the "Black Sheep" record, due to the image of a Manx Loaghtan black sheep on the front cover. The record also features one of the very rare times when Ian Astbury and Billy Duffy have shared songwriting credit with anyone: bassist Craig Adams is credited as co-author of "Universal You".

Musical style
The style of music on the album is more reminiscent of the grunge and alternative rock music popular at the time, and of noise rock, with its use of distortion and feedback.

Album information
Vocalist Ian Astbury referred to the record as "very personal, and very revealing" songs about his life, with the subject matter ranging from sexual abuse at the age of 15, to the death of Nigel Preston (friend and former drummer for The Cult), to his directionless years spent in Glasgow in the late 1970s. But the record was barely noticed, only reaching US#69, and UK#21, and then quickly dropping out of sight. Reportedly it reached number one on the charts in Portugal, but quickly dropped out of sight as well. The single "Coming Down (Drug Tongue)" (UK#51) was released with the band going on tour in support of the new album. Only one more single, "Star" (UK#65), was officially released. That song began life in 1986 as "Tom Petty" before being dropped by the band during rehearsals. In 1993 the song was resurrected once again as "Starchild", and was finally completed for the record in 1994 as, just simply, "Star".

"Be Free" was also released as a single both in Canada, as a promotional CD with a purchase of a party pack of Labatt Genuine Draft, and in France by Virgin Records as an extremely rare edited version along with the edit of "Coming Down (Drug Tongue)". "Sacred Life" was released as a promotional only single in Spain and the Netherlands, and "Saints are Down" was released as a promotional single in Greece.

"Gone" was released as a limited edition (only 2000 made) 7 inch vinyl single with artwork and handwritten lyrics by Ian Astbury.

The Australian version contains an extra CD, with nine songs recorded live at the Marquee Club in London in November 1991.

The album peaked at #64 on the US Cashbox charts.

Track listing
All songs written by Ian Astbury and Billy Duffy, unless otherwise stated.
"Gone" – 3:50
"Coming Down (Drug Tongue)" – 6:36
"Real Grrrl" – 4:25
"Black Sun" – 6:23
"Naturally High" – 4:23
"Joy" – 4:46
"Star" – 5:02
"Sacred Life" – 5:47
"Be Free" – 3:48
"Universal You" (Astbury, Duffy, Craig Adams) – 5:17
"Emperor's New Horse" – 4:22
"Saints Are Down" – 6:54

There is an advance promotional CD and cassette tape version, which uses unmastered versions of the tracks and slightly rearranges the track listing:

"Gone" – 3:46
"Coming Down (Drug Tongue)" – 6:12
"Real Grrrl" – 4:21
"Black Sun" – 6:16
"Naturally High" – 4:13
"Emperor's New Horse" – 4:17
"Star" – 4:57
"Sacred Life" – 5:39
"Be Free" – 3:44
"Universal You" (Astbury, Duffy, Craig Adams) – 5:08
"Joy" – 4:44
"Saints Are Down" – 6:48

Personnel
The Cult
Ian Astbury – vocals, acoustic guitar, guitar, tambourine
Billy Duffy – guitar
Craig Adams – bass
Scott Garrett – drums
Additional personnel
Scott Humphrey – keyboards, programming
Jim McGiueray – percussion
Bob Rock – guitars, bass, keyboard – various tracks, mixing
Technical
Mario Caldato, Jr. – mixing
George Marino (at Sterling Sound) – mastering

References

External links
Official website album page

1994 albums
The Cult albums
Albums produced by Bob Rock
Beggars Banquet Records albums